The Al Anad Air Base missile attack was a strike carried out by the pro-Saleh Yemeni Army and Houthi militants with a ballistic missile against a military camp in the Al Anad Air Base that was being used by troops of the Saudi-led coalition, in Lahij Governorate.

Attack
Yemeni military loyal to and Houthi fighters targeted the Al Anad Air Base with a Tochka ballistic missile, the strike inflicted numerous casualties on the coalition forces including Academi mercenaries. Reports said that there were over 200 casualties in the camp, including the new leader of Academi in Yemen US Colonel Nicholas Petros. Military material was allegedly destroyed, including Saudi led coalition Apaches.

Aftermath
Houthi forces launched another attack on Alanad Air Base in 2019 using drones.

References

Yemeni Civil War (2014–present)
January 2016 events in Asia
2016 in Yemen
Lahij Governorate